
The following is an alphabetical list of all 380 county-level entities in Poland.

A county or powiat (pronounced povyat) is the second level of Polish administrative division, between the voivodeship (provinces) and the gmina (municipalities or communes; plural "gminy"). The list includes the 314 "land counties" (powiaty ziemskie) and the 66 "city counties" (miasta na prawach powiatu or powiaty grodzkie). For general information about these entities, see the article on powiats.

The following information is given in the list:
English name (as used in Wikipedia)
Polish name (does not apply to most city counties, since these are not translated). Note that sometimes two different counties have the same name in Polish (for example, Brzeg County and Brzesko County both have the original name powiat brzeski).
County seat (not given in the case of city counties, as the seat is simply the city itself). Note that sometimes the seat is not part of the county, being itself a separate city county; in these cases the name of the seat is asterisked.
Voivodeship of which the county is a part.
Area in square kilometres.
Number of gminy into which the county is divided (not given in the case of city counties, since these always constitute a single gmina).
Population (according to official figures for 2006 ).

For tables of counties by voivodeship, see the articles on the particular voivodeships (Greater Poland Voivodeship etc.).

Table of counties

 
Counties
Poland 2
Counties, Poland